Petrenkovo is a rural locality (a selo) and the administrative center of Petrenkovskoye Rural Settlement, Ostrogozhsky District, Voronezh Oblast, Russia. The population was 543 as of 2010. There are 5 streets.

Geography 
Petrenkovo is located 11 km southeast of Ostrogozhsk (the district's administrative centre) by road. Pakholok is the nearest rural locality.

References 

Rural localities in Ostrogozhsky District